USS Sunset (CVE-48) (previously AVG-48 then ACV-48) was a . Assigned on 23 August 1942 to MC hull 259, a modified C3-S-A1 laid down on 23 February 1943 by Seattle-Tacoma Shipbuilding of Tacoma, Washington; launched on 15 July and redesignated CVE-48 the same day; sponsored by Mrs. C.E. Taylor.

HMS Thane operated in the North Atlantic protecting convoys and ferrying aircraft for use in the European Theater. Taken to Gare Loch in the Firth of Clyde, southwest Scotland, she was examined, declared a constructive total loss and decommissioned to reserve. She was returned to United States custody while in the United Kingdom on 12 May. Determined to be of no use to the United States Navy, she was slated for disposal in October; and she was subsequently scrapped.

Design and description

 
These ships were all larger and had a greater aircraft capacity than all the preceding American built escort carriers. They were also all laid down as escort carriers and not converted merchant ships.

Armament comprised: two 4"/50, 5"/38 or 5"/51 Dual Purpose guns in single mounts, sixteen 40 mm Bofors anti-aircraft guns in twin mounts and twenty 20 mm Oerlikon anti-aircraft cannons in single mounts. They had a maximum aircraft capacity of twenty-four aircraft which could be a mixture of Grumman Martlet, Vought F4U Corsair or Hawker Sea Hurricane fighter aircraft and Fairey Swordfish or Grumman Avenger anti-submarine aircraft.

The last voyage of Thane brought the first helicopters to the UK. Nine Sikorsky R-4B Hoverflys were flown on at Norfolk, Virginia on 29–30 December 1944, snowy weather delaying the loading of half of them to the following day. On arrival of the damaged Thane, seven were flown off to RDU Abbotsinch and two, thought to be damaged, were craned off.

Notes

References

External links
 Photo gallery at navsource.org

 

Ruler-class escort carriers
Ships built in Tacoma, Washington
1943 ships
Ships sunk by German submarines in World War II
Maritime incidents in January 1945